Paraskevi Kantza (born 8 August 1976) is a paralympic athlete from Greece competing mainly in category T11 sprint events and the long jump.

Paraskevi has competed in three Paralympics competing in the T11 100m, 200m and long jump.  Her first games were the 2004 Summer Paralympics in her home country where she won a bronze in the 100m.  She was unable to match this in Beijing in the 2008 Summer Paralympics and in London in 2012 Summer Paralympics where she failed to win any medals.

References

External links 
 

Living people
1976 births
Sportspeople from Agrinio
Paralympic athletes of Greece
Greek female sprinters
Greek female long jumpers
Athletes (track and field) at the 2004 Summer Paralympics
Athletes (track and field) at the 2008 Summer Paralympics
Athletes (track and field) at the 2012 Summer Paralympics
Paralympic bronze medalists for Greece
Medalists at the 2004 Summer Paralympics
Medalists at the World Para Athletics Championships
Medalists at the World Para Athletics European Championships
Paralympic medalists in athletics (track and field)
Paralympic sprinters
Paralympic long jumpers
Visually impaired sprinters
Visually impaired long jumpers